A Kentucky Cardinal is American writer James Lane Allen's third novel.  It was published in 1894 as the first of the A Kentucky Cardinal series.

1894 American novels
Novels set in Kentucky